Thrall is an unincorporated community in Kittitas County, in the U.S. state of Washington.

History
A post office called Thrall was established in 1911, and remained in operation until 1915. The community bears the name of a railroad worker.

References

Unincorporated communities in Kittitas County, Washington
Unincorporated communities in Washington (state)